Mosedale may refer to:
Mosedale, Cumbria, a hamlet in Mungrisdale parish, Eden District, Cumbria, England
The valley of Mosedale Beck (Wast Water)
The Mosedale Horseshoe, classic mountain walk from Wasdale Head in this valley
The valley of Mosedale Beck (Glenderamackin), running north from Great Dodd, Cumbria, England
Mosedale Viaduct on the Cockermouth, Keswick and Penrith Railway in this valley
The valley of Mosedale Beck (Swindale), running between Branstree and Tarn Crag, Cumbria, England
The valley which meets the River Duddon at the foot of the Hardknott Pass, Cumbria, England

People with the name 
William Mosedale (1894-1971), English George Cross recipient

See also
List of Mosedale valleys and Mosedale Becks
Mosedale Beck (disambiguation)